Valley City State University (VCSU) is a public university in Valley City, North Dakota. It is part of the North Dakota University System. Founded in 1890 as Valley City State Normal School, a two-year teachers' college, it was authorized to confer bachelor's degrees in 1921 and changed its name to Valley City State Teachers College. With an expansion in programs outside teacher education after World War II, it became Valley City State College in 1963. In 1986, it was renamed State University of North Dakota-Valley City and a year later received its current name.

VCSU offers over 80 undergraduate programs and an online Master of Education degree program. In 2015, VCSU graduated 302 students, the largest class in its 125-year history.

Since 1996, VCSU has been a "laptop" campus by issuing laptop computers to full-time students. The cost of the laptops are part of the university's technology fee which also covers other educational technology enhancements such as campus-wide wireless network access and smart classrooms.

VCSU is listed as a Historic District on the National Register of Historic Places.

Athletics
The Valley City State athletic teams are called the Vikings. The university is a member of the National Association of Intercollegiate Athletics (NAIA), primarily competing as a member of the North Star Athletic Association (NSAA) as a founding member since the 2013–14 academic year. The Vikings previously competed as an NAIA Independent within the Association of Independent Institutions (AII) from 2011–12 to 2012–13; and in these defunct conferences: the Dakota Athletic Conference (DAC) from 2000–01 to 2010–11; and the North Dakota College Athletic Conference (NDCAC) from 1922–23 to 1999–2000.

Valley City State competes in 12 intercollegiate varsity sports: Men's sports include baseball, basketball, cross country, football, golf and track & field; while women's sports include basketball, cross country, golf, softball, track & field and volleyball.

Notable alumni
Paul Fjelde, noted sculptor and professor
Todd Hoffner, head football coach at Minnesota State University, Mankato
Thomas Kleppe (1919–2007), former U.S. Representative from North Dakota and U.S. Secretary of the Interior
Carleton Opgaard, noted educator
James D. Ployhar, noted composer and music educator
Earl Pomeroy, U.S. Representative from North Dakota
Gary Tharaldson, founder of the Tharaldson Companies
Jason Perkins, basketball player

References

External links
 
 Official athletics website

 
Public universities and colleges in North Dakota
Educational institutions established in 1889
Buildings and structures in Barnes County, North Dakota
Education in Barnes County, North Dakota
1889 establishments in Dakota Territory